The Mermaids Singing (1995) is a crime novel by Scottish author Val McDermid. The first featuring her recurring protagonist, Dr. Tony Hill, it was adapted into the pilot episode of ITV1's television series based on McDermid's work, Wire in the Blood, starring Robson Green and Hermione Norris.

The title is part of the fifth line from the poem Song by John Donne, that was referenced in a poem by T. S. Eliot, The Love Song of J. Alfred Prufrock.

It was referenced in The Girl with the Dragon Tattoo by Stieg Larsson.

Synopsis
In the fictional English city of Bradfield, men are being abducted and tortured to death using brutal medieval techniques. The bodies are then found in areas frequented by gay men and women. The police reluctantly recruit a criminal profiler, Dr. Tony Hill. He joins forces with Detective Inspector Carol Jordan, for whom he develops complicated romantic feelings. Dr. Tony Hill has problems of his own, including a mysterious woman named Angelica who frequently calls him for phone sex. As Tony becomes increasingly involved in the investigation, it becomes apparent that the killer is seeking Tony as the next victim. The killer is revealed to be the anonymous caller Angelica, a transgender woman who kills men that do not return her affections. When kidnapped, Tony figures out her weakness (her desire to be loved) and uses it to avoid being tortured and murdered.

Difference between the book and TV show
 In the book Tony kills Angelica to save himself, whereas in the TV show the police arrive before Tony needs to kill her.
 In the book more details are provided about Angelica's backstory; including that a psychiatrist believed that they were a gay man, rather than a woman, who was in denial of this for social reasons, and that she obtained the money for her sex change through sex work.

References

1995 British novels
Novels by Val McDermid
Tony Hill series
HarperCollins books